EPW may refer to:

Earth Penetrating Weapon, a tactical nuclear weapon
Economic and Political Weekly, an Indian journal/magazine 
Electric-powered wheelchair, a form of wheelchair
Enemy prisoner of war, the U.S. military term for enemy prisoners of war (POWs)
Exciting Pro Wrestling, a Japanese game series by Yuke's
Explosive Pro Wrestling, a professional wrestling promotion